Entropy, in thermodynamics, is a property originally introduced to explain the part of the internal energy of a thermodynamic system that is unavailable as a source for useful work.

Entropy may also refer to:

Thermodynamics and statistical mechanics
Entropy (classical thermodynamics), thermodynamic entropy in macroscopic terms, with less emphasis on the statistical explanation
Entropic force. The product of temperature and the gradient of the entropy density is viewed an effective force, yielding a gradient in the energy density of a system.
Entropy production. Development of entropy in a thermodynamic system.
Entropy (statistical thermodynamics), the statistical explanation of thermodynamic entropy based on probability theory
Configuration entropy, the entropy change due to a change in the knowledge of the position of particles, rather than their momentum
Conformational entropy, the entropy change due to a change in the "configuration" of a particle (e.g. a right-handed vs. a left-handed polyatomic molecule)
Tsallis entropy, a generalization of Boltzmann-Gibbs entropy
von Neumann entropy, entropy in quantum statistical physics and quantum information science

Introductory articles 
Introduction to entropy an explanation on entropy as a measure of irreversibility
Entropy (order and disorder), the relationship of disorder with heat and work
Entropy in thermodynamics and information theory, the relationship between thermodynamic entropy and information (Shannon) entropy
Entropy (energy dispersal), dispersal of energy as a descriptor of entropy

Other aspects 
History of entropy
Entropy and life, the relationship between the thermodynamic entropy and the evolution of life
Entropy (astrophysics), the adiabatic constant

Information theory and mathematics
Entropy (information theory), also called Shannon entropy, a measure of the unpredictability or information content of a message source 
Differential entropy, a generalization of Entropy (information theory) to continuous random variables
Entropy of entanglement, related to the Shannon and von Neumann entropies for entangled systems; reflecting the degree of entanglement of subsystems
Algorithmic entropy an (incomputable) measure of the information content of a particular message
Rényi entropy, a family of diversity measures generalising Shannon entropy; used to define fractal dimensions
Measure theoretic entropy, a measure of exponential growth in dynamical systems; equivalent to the rate of increase of Shannon entropy of a trajectory in trajectory-space
Topological entropy, a measure of exponential growth in dynamical systems; equivalent to the rate of increase of α->0 Renyi entropy of a trajectory in trajectory-space.
Topological entropy in physics
Volume entropy, a Riemannian invariant measuring the exponential rate of volume growth of a Riemannian metric
Maximum entropy (disambiguation)
Graph entropy, a measure of the information rate achievable by communicating symbols over a channel in which certain pairs of values may be confused.

Other uses in science and technology
Entropy encoding, data compression strategies to produce a code length equal to the entropy of a message
Entropy (computing), an indicator of the number of random bits available to seed cryptography systems
Entropy (anesthesiology), a measure of a patient's cortical function, based on the mathematical entropy of EEG signals
Entropy (ecology), measures of biodiversity in the study of biological ecology, based on Shannon and Rényi entropies
Social entropy, a measure of the natural decay within a social system

Media 
 Entropy (choreography) - the difference between a transcription and a performance

Film and television
 Entropy (film), a 1999 film by Phil Joanou
 "Entropy" (Buffy episode)
 "Entropy", an episode of Criminal Minds (season 11)

Games
 Entropy (1977 board game)
 Entropy (video game)
 Entropy or Alchemiss, a character in Freedom Force vs the 3rd Reich
 N. Tropy, a character from Crash Bandicoot: Warped

Literature
Entropy: A New World View, a book by Jeremy Rifkin and Ted Howard
"Entropy", a 1960 short story by Thomas Pynchon
"Entropy", a 1995 short story by Leanne Frahm
Entropy (journal), a scientific journal published by MDPI
Entropy (magazine), an online literary magazine

Music
 Entropy (album), an album by Anathallo and Javelins
 Entropy / Send Them, an EP by DJ Shadow and the Groove Robbers
 "Entropy", a song by Bad Religion from Against the Grain 
 "Entropy", a song by Kelly Osbourne from Sleeping in the Nothing
 "Entropy", a song by VNV Nation from Matter + Form 
 "Entropy", a song by Moxy Früvous from The 'b' Album 
 "Entropy", a song by Brymo from Oṣó
 "Entropy", a song by Daniel Caesar from Case Study 01
 "Entropy", a song by MC Hawking
 "Entropy", a song by Grimes and Bleachers
 Entropia (album), an album by Pain of Salvation
Entropy, a track by Nigel Stanford
The Book Of Us: Entropy, an album by DAY6

Software
Entropy (package manager), a Sabayon Linux package manager